Montevideo Maru was a Japanese auxiliary ship that was sunk by the USN in World War II, resulting in the drowning of 1,054 Australians (prisoners of war and civilians) who were being transported from Rabaul to Hainan, in what is considered the worst maritime disaster in Australia's history. Prior to the war the ship operated as a passenger and cargo vessel traveling mainly between Japan and Brazil carrying Japanese emigrants.

Ship history
Montevideo Maru was one of three ships (along with Santos Maru and La Plata Maru) of the Osaka Shosen Kaisha (OSK) shipping line built for their trans-Pacific service to South America. The 7,267-ton ship was constructed at the Mitsubishi Zosen Kakoki Kaisha shipyard at Nagasaki, and launched in 1926.

WWII service
Participated in the in the Invasion of Makassar, Celebes 6-16 February, 1942. Did a number of transport missions before being sunk.

Sinking
On 22 June 1942, some weeks after the fall of Rabaul to the Japanese, many Australian prisoners were embarked from Rabaul's port onto Montevideo Maru. She was proceeding without escort to the Chinese island of Hainan when she was sighted by the American submarine  near the northern Philippine coast on 30 June.

Unaware that it was carrying Allied prisoners of war and civilians, Sturgeon fired four torpedoes at Montevideo Maru before dawn of 1 July, causing the vessel to sink in only 11 minutes. According to Yamaji, Australians in the water sang "Auld Lang Syne" to their trapped comrades as the ship sank beneath the waves.

The sinking is considered the worst maritime disaster in Australia's history. A nominal list made available by the Japanese government in 2012 revealed that a total of 1054 prisoners (178 non-commissioned officers, 667 soldiers and 209 civilians) died on the Montevideo Maru; there were no survivors among the prisoners. Of the ship's total complement, approximately twenty Japanese crew survived, out of an original 88 guards and crew.

Among the missing prisoners were:
Harold Page, deputy administrator of New Guinea and brother of Australian prime minister Earle Page.
Reverend Syd Beazley of the Methodist Mission, the uncle of future Australian Labor Party leader Kim Beazley. 
 Tom Vernon Garrett, the grandfather of Midnight Oil lead singer and government minister Peter Garrett.
 22 Salvation Army bandsmen, the majority being members of the Brunswick Citadel band. The bandsmen had enlisted together and comprised the majority of the band of the 2/22nd Battalion.

Memorials
A memorial to those who lost their lives was erected at the Repatriation Hospital, Bell Street, Heidelberg, Melbourne, Victoria (Australia). A Montevideo Maru memorial has also been erected near the centre of the Australian Ex-Prisoners of War Memorial in Ballarat, Victoria.  A commemoration service was held at the unveiling of the memorial on 7 February 2004.

In late January 2010, Federal Member of Parliament, Stuart Robert, called upon the then Prime Minister of Australia, Kevin Rudd, to back the search for Montevideo Maru, in the same way that he had supported the search for AHS Centaur.

The song "In the Valley" from the album Earth and Sun and Moon by Australian pop/rock band Midnight Oil opens with the autobiographical line, "My grandfather went down with the Montevideo/The Rising Sun sent him floating to his rest," sung by Peter Garrett.

Controversies

Cause of deaths

Some have questioned whether some or all of the POWs were aboard the ship and not massacred earlier. Others believe that some of the Australians survived, only to die later. Of the known survivors, the only one to ever be questioned was former merchant seaman Yoshiaki Yamaji. In a 2003 The 7:30 Report interview, he stated that he was told that some of the POWs had been picked up and taken to Kobe. Veteran Albert Speer, who served in New Guinea, believes that survivors were transported to Sado Island, only to perish days before the dropping of atomic bombs on Japan. Professor Hank Nelson considers it unlikely that any Japanese ship would have stopped to rescue prisoners with a hostile submarine nearby.

The Rabaul garrison has been described as a "sacrificial lamb" by biographer David Day. Lark Force was left without reinforcements, and instructed not to withdraw in accordance with official War Cabinet policy at the time in regards to small garrisons. Harold Page, the senior government official in the territory, was instructed to evacuate only "unnecessary" civilians and was refused permission to evacuate any administrative staff; he was listed among those killed on the Montevideo Maru.

Number of casualties
It has been historically difficult to determine a definitive number of the dead. As late as 2010, Australia's Minister for Defence Personnel, Alan Griffin, stated that "there is no absolutely confirmed roll". Australian Army officer Major Harold S Williams' 1945 list of the Australian dead was lost, along with the original Japanese list in Katakana it had been compiled from; these challenges have been exacerbated by the forensic difficulties of recovering remains lost at sea.

In 2012, the Japanese government handed over thousands of POW documents to the Australian government and Montevideo Marus manifest, which contained the names of all the Australians on board, was found to be among them. The translation of the manifest was released in June 2012, confirming a total of 1,054 Australians, of which 845 were from Lark Force.

The new translation also corrected a longstanding historical error in the number of civilians who went down with the ship. There were 209, not 208 as previously thought. This is not an additional casualty; rather the historical number was simply inaccurate.

Sources also continue to contradict each other regarding the number of Japanese crew who survived. Some reports indicate 18 survivors, one of whom died soon afterwards. Other sources indicate that 17 Japanese seamen and three guards survived.

See also
List by death toll of ships sunk by submarines

References

External links
People of the Plaque, a tribute to civilians from New Ireland who died in the war
A Story of the Salvos, Compass, ABC television, 20 April 2008
Lark Force, part of the Australian Army garrison on Rabaul
"Montevideo Maru remembered 70 years on" – Australian Broadcasting Corporation

1926 ships
World War II merchant ships of Japan
Ships sunk by American submarines
World War II shipwrecks in the South China Sea
Maritime incidents in July 1942
Ships built by Mitsubishi Heavy Industries
Japanese hell ships